Marcelino M. Navarra (June 2, 1914 – March 28, 1984) was a Filipino Visayan editor, poet, and writer from Cebu, Philippines. He was regarded as the father of modern Cebuano short story for his use of realism and depictions of fictionalized version of his hometown, barrio Tuyom in Carcar, Cebu.

Early life 
Navarra was born and grew up in Tuyom, a small barrio in Carcar, Cebu on June 2, 1914. He later was laid to rest upon his death on March 28, 1984, in his hometown. A product of American education, he finished up to second year in high school, and then moved to Manila to seek employment. Later, he settled back in Tuyom, got married and had nine children.

Literary career 
He wrote poetry and over 80 short stories before and after World War II from 1930 until 1955 with the pseudonym Marcel Navarra.

Modern Cebuano fiction 
His works were marked with the employment of realism at a time when fantasy, didacticism and sentimentalism were in vogue, earning him the recognition as the father of modern Cebuano poetry. His reputation as the best fictionist in his generation was cemented from the short stories he wrote after World War II.

Navarra is best known for the short story Ug Gianod Ako (And I Was Drifted Away) that won first prize in literary contest by Bisaya magazine in 1937. It was hailed as the first modern short story written in Cebuano language for its lyrical language, psychological realism and depth. According to literary critic Erlinda Alburo, Ug Gianod Ako and another of his short story, Apasumpay (Postscript), were landmarks in Cebuano literature for their innovative use of point of view and the manner in which they blended local materials and Western narrative techniques.

Fictionalized Tuyom 
In particular, Navarra's subjects often were the poor people in his barrio of Tuyom and their daily struggles for survival. Critic Sam Harold Kho Nervez claimed that the environment inhabited by his characters that was ravaged by war, poverty, and moral decay was a representation of their inner traumatized selves and considered his "brand of social realism outstanding." Teresita Maceda also commented that his fiction illustrated that the "barren land could yield beauty too, beauty of the more lasting kind... He showed Cebuanos a way of coming to terms with the difficult life demanded of them, a way that was the result of his realistic appraisal of his people's experience."

Editor 
He edited several Cebuano periodicals. He was the editor of Lamdag (Light) in 1947, associate editor of Bulak (Flower) in 1948, literary section editor of Republic Daily from 1948 until 1952, and editor of Bag-ong Suga (New Light) from 1963 to 1967.

From 1938 to 1941, he was the literary editor of Bisaya magazine. Before his appointment as its editor-in-chief from 1969 until his retirement in 1973, the magazine's circulation decreased that was partly attributed to the general decline of sales among regional magazines with the rise of the movie industry and the stream-of-consciousness writing introduced by its former editor, the University of the Philippines graduate Godofredo Roperos, which was not received well by its readers. During Navarra's term, the magazine's readership was sustained and increased despite the fact he maintained storytelling that continued to depict everyday human experiences that appealed to readers at a time when other periodicals resorted to sensationalism to attract readers.

LUDABI
After Navarra stopped writing in 1955 upon the publication of the short story Zosimo, he remained active in the literary circle. Together with his contemporaries, he helped establish  and once led the writers' group Lubas sa Dagang Bisaya (Core of Cebuano Writing) or LUDABI for short in 1956. The group, which has chapters in many parts of Visayas and Mindanao, had initiated annual literary contest in short story, poetry, essay, and one-act play that encouraged younger writers to creative writing and for older writers to shift in style and attitude.

He retired in December 1973 and died on March 28, 1984.

Historical commemoration 
 The book Marcel Navarra's Mga Piling Kwentong Sebuwano (Marcel Navarra's Selected Cebuano Short Stories) contained 12 of his short stories that were compiled, edited, and translated into Filipino and English by Teresita Gimenez Maceda. It was published in 1986.

Further reading 
 For his published works that were printed in Bag-ong Kusog, see Cebuano Studies Center.
Maceda, Teresita, Marcel M. Navarra: Mga Piling Kuwentong Sebuwano, University of the Philippine Press (1986)
Maceda, Teresita, The Barrio in Navarra's Fiction, Philippine Studies (1977)
Maceda, Teresita, The Vision of Life in Marcel Navarra's Fiction: A Study of the Cebuano Short Story, Ateneo de Manila University (1975)
Nervez, Sam Harold Kho, Wars Within Without: Social Neurosis in Marcel M. Navarra’s Short Fiction, University of San Carlos: Cebuano Studies Center Carcar Lecture Series (2013)

References

External links
 Cebuano Studies Center: Marcelino Navarra

1914 births
1984 deaths
Visayan people
Cebuano writers
20th-century Filipino writers
Writers from Cebu
People from Cebu
Filipino short story writers
Filipino poets
Filipino editors
Cebuano language
Cebuano literature